The following is a list of counties (județe) in Romania, ordered by population, between 1948 and 2011. The data is taken from the Romanian National Institute of Statistics (INSSE) censuses results, as well as from the Romanian Statistical Yearbook published by INSSE.

The data is provided from the following censuses:
January 25, 1948
February 21, 1956
March 15, 1966
January 5, 1977
January 7, 1992
March 18, 2002
October 20, 2011

See also
List of Romanian Counties by Area

References

Counties by Population
Romanian counties